Mrs. Pammi Pyarelal is an Indian television comedy-drama series which premiered on Colors TV on 15 July 2013. The story centers around Pammi played  Gaurav Gera who cross-dresses as a woman. This show was last aired on 5 October 2013.

Plot 

Param comes to Mumbai to become an actor which is his dream. He plans to live with his childhood friend Rahul. Rahul gets kicked out of the house that he lived in, as he couldn't pay the rent to the landlord. Thereafter, the two are unsuccessful in finding a place to live until Param pretends to be Rahul's wife by dressing up as a girl. Both live in the Faujdar Villa together as tenants . However, they face a various problems. They always get out of them easily . In all these dramas, Pandey Ji becomes their Mama (Maternal Uncle ). Param falls for Minty and Rahul falls for Gayatri. They both struggle for their love and get them at the end.

Cast
Gaurav Gera as Param Gulati / Pammi Pyarelal - had to disguise as Pammi, Rahul's wife in order to get shelter at the Faujdar mansion. He falls in love with Minty at first sight 
Karan Godhwani  as Rahul Pyarelal - helps Param disguise himself into Pammi and both pretend to play husband and wife in front of everyone. Later falls in love with Gayatri 
Dimple Jhangiani as Minty Param Gulati née Faujdar - becomes Pammi's best friend and later she finds out the truth and falls in love with Param. She is Gayatri's sister and Rajbir and Amrita's daughter
Vindhya Tiwari as Gayatri Rahul Pyarelal née Faujdar - she becomes attracted to Rahul even though she thinks he's ‘married’ to Pammi. However, along with Minty she finds out the truth and her and Rahul fall in love 
Usha Nadkarni as Kamini Faujdar - the strict matriarch of the Faujdar family. Rajbir, Ranjit and Randhir's mother 
Sanjeev Jotangiya as Rajbir Faujdar - Gayatri and Minty's father
Sonia Rakkar as Amrita Faujdar - Gayatri and Minty's mother
Prasad Barve as Randhir Faujdar - Kamini's second son 
Rinku Ghosh as Mohini Faujdar - Randhir's wife 
Mazher Sayed as Ranjit Faujdar - he falls in love with Pammi even though she is actually a man
Akshay Dogra as Sunny

References

External links
Mrs. Pammi Pyarelal Official Site on Colors

2013 Indian television series debuts
2013 Indian television series endings
Indian comedy television series
Colors TV original programming
Cross-dressing in television